Sirringhaus is a surname. Notable people with the surname include:
 Henning Sirringhaus, British scientist and academic
 Hendrik Sirringhaus (born 1985), German ice hockey goaltender